The Simple Truth: A Concert for Kurdish Refugees was a 1991 fundraising concert in support of Kurdish Refugees after the Gulf War. The concert was produced by Tony Hollingsworth, with Jeffrey Archer also involved. It was staged in London, Amsterdam, Philadelphia and Sydney, and broadcast on television in 36 countries. During the concert, $15 million in donations were collected.

Nearly 12,000 people attended the concert at Wembley Arena in London, including the then Prime Minister John Major and Princess Diana.

The amount of money raised by the concert is uncertain. At a press conference on 19 June 1991 a figure of £57 million was stated, though this consisted mainly of aid offered by overseas governments. An investigation found that the concert and its associated appeal had raised £3 million, and Kurdish groups said that around £250,000 had been received by people in Iraq. Allegations concerning the misappropriation of funds were not substantiated.

Featured artists 
 Beverley Craven
 Chris de Burgh
 Gloria Estefan
 Peter Gabriel
 Gypsy Kings
 Hall & Oates
 MC Hammer
 Whitney Houston
 Lavine Hudson
 INXS
 Tom Jones
 Alison Moyet
 New Kids on the Block
 Sinead O’Connor
 Alexander O’Neal
 Shiven Perwer
 Ryuichi Sakamoto
 Paul Simon
 Snap!
 Lisa Stansfield
 Rod Stewart
 Sting

References

External links 
 
The Simple Truth: A Concert for Kurdish Refugees: at listen campaign

1991 concerts